Digby, officially named the Municipality of the District of Digby, is a district municipality in Digby County, Nova Scotia, Canada. Statistics Canada classifies the district municipality as a municipal district.

The district municipality forms the eastern part of Digby County. It is one of three municipal units in the county, the other two being the Town of Digby and the Municipality of the District of Clare.

Demographics 

Communities 

 Bear River
 Gilberts Cove
 Little River, Digby, Nova Scotia
Marshalltown
Jordantown
Conway
Acaciaville
Hillgrove
North Range
Brighton
Barton
Weymouth
Sissiboo Falls
Weymouth Falls
Doucetteville
Ashmore
 Morganville
 Plympton
 Smith's Cove
Culloden
Bayview
Rossway
 Sandy Cove
Centreville
Mink Cove
Tiddville
Whale Cove
East Ferry
Tiverton
Central Grove
Freeport
Westport
Seabrook

Access routes
Highways and numbered routes that run through the district municipality, including external routes that start or finish at the municipal boundary:

Highways

Trunk Routes

Collector Routes:

External Routes:
None

See also
 List of municipalities in Nova Scotia

References

External links

Communities in Digby County, Nova Scotia
District municipalities in Nova Scotia